People's Republic of China first competed at the Asian Para Games in 2010. China has led the gold medal count in each Asian Games since 2010 Asian Games. At the Asian Para Games in 2010, Yuqing Cai won the first gold medal for China in Women's 400m freestyle -S9 final. Hangzhou in Zhejiang Province, China will host the fourth edition of the Asian Para Games in 2022.

Asian Games

*Red border color indicates tournament was held on home soil.

Medals by Games

See also
 China at the Paralympics
 Sports in China

References

Asian Paralympic Games https://web.archive.org/web/20190413080056/http://www.asianparalympic.org/indonesia-2018-asian-para-games. retrieved 2019-04-15

 
Nations at the Asian Para Games